Statistics of Swedish football Division 2 for the 1956–57 season.

League standings

Norrland

Svealand

Östra Götaland

Västra Götaland

Allsvenskan promotion playoffs 
GIF Sundsvall - IFK Eskilstuna 3-6 (1-1, 2-2, 0-3)
Örgryte IS - Motala AIF  3-8 (3-4, 0-4)

IFK Eskilstuna and Motala AIF promoted to Allsvenskan.

References
Sweden - List of final tables (Clas Glenning)

Swedish Football Division 2 seasons
2
Sweden